Beginning in the 1970 NFL season, the National Football League began scheduling a weekly regular season game on Monday night before a national television audience. From 1970 to 2005, the ABC television network carried these games, with the ESPN cable television network taking over beginning in September 2006. Listed below are games played from 1970 to 1989.

Stadiums and teams appearing under different names
Some stadiums and teams had multiple names throughout their appearances in the MNF package in this era.

First name listed is the stadium/team's name heading into 1990. All names were seen in the package at least once in this era.

Stadiums
Atlanta–Fulton County Stadium – Atlanta Stadium
Foxboro Stadium – Schaefer Stadium (the facility did not host a game while it was named Sullivan Stadium)
Jack Murphy Stadium – San Diego Stadium

Teams
Indianapolis Colts – Baltimore Colts
Los Angeles Raiders  -Oakland Raiders
Phoenix Cardinals – Chicago Cardinals - St. Louis Cardinals - Arizona Cardinals

1970s

1970 NFL season
In only the second MNF game on September 28, Kansas City Chiefs quarterback Len Dawson became the first quarterback to throw for 4 touchdown passes on Monday Night Football.

The October 19 game between the Washington Redskins and Oakland Raiders was originally scheduled as a head coaching matchup between Vince Lombardi of the Redskins and the Raiders' second-year mentor, John Madden. However, Lombardi died of colon cancer six weeks before the contest. In that game, Raiders running back Hewritt Dixon rushed for 164 yards and a touchdown.

The October 26 game between the Los Angeles Rams and Minnesota Vikings was notable when for the 1st time in MNF history, a team (Rams) didn't score a touchdown in the entire game. The result was a 13-3 Vikings win.

Following their humiliating shutout in the November 16 game (which is also the 1st shutout in MNF history), the Cowboys would go on a seven-game winning streak, not losing until a deciding field goal in the final seconds of Super Bowl V against the Baltimore Colts. The St. Louis Cardinals, who completed a season sweep of the Cowboys at the Cotton Bowl would go 1–3–1 down the stretch to fall completely out of the playoffs and cost coach Charley Winner his job.

The Colts and Packers simultaneously became the first teams to make their second appearances on MNF when they played each other. The Browns, Lions, and Rams were the only other teams to make two MNF appearances in 1970. The only teams that did not appear on MNF in 1970 were the 49ers (who first appeared in 1971), the Saints and Patriots (who first appeared in 1972) and the Broncos and Bills (who first appeared in consecutive weeks in 1973).

The November 23 game became infamous when an intoxicated Howard Cosell slurred his way through the first half and vomited on Don Meredith's boots at halftime. Cosell left Franklin Field prior to the second half, leaving Meredith to finish the game with Keith Jackson.

1971 NFL season
The October 11 game was the final NFL contest played in the Cotton Bowl. The Dallas Cowboys moved into Texas Stadium for its next home game on October 24 versus the New England Patriots.

Wide receiver Dave Smith of the Pittsburgh Steelers became a part of Monday Night Football lore with an infamous mistake in the October 18 game against the Kansas City Chiefs. Smith was en route to scoring on a 50-yard pass play when he raised the ball over his head before reaching the end zone. Smith lost control of the ball, thinking he had already scored, with the mistake resulting in a touchback for the Chiefs.

The November 1 game between the visiting Detroit Lions and the Green Bay Packers ended in a 14–14 tie at County Stadium in Milwaukee.  The first tie in the history of the Monday Night Football series.

The December 13 game saw the triumphant return of George Allen to the Los Angeles Memorial Coliseum, where he coached the Los Angeles Rams for five seasons (1966–70). Allen's new team, the Washington Redskins, clinched its first playoff berth since 1945 with a 38–24 victory over the Rams, also handing the NFC West championship to the San Francisco 49ers. Ironically, the 49ers ousted the Redskins from the playoffs with a 24–20 victory 13 days later. In addition, one of the contestants for an NFL punt, pass and kick contest shown during the game would be future Philadelphia Eagles and Kansas City Chiefs head coach Andy Reid.

The October 25 game featured a moment of silence for Lions wide receiver Chuck Hughes who died of a heart attack on the field at Tiger Stadium the previous day.

The 49ers made their MNF debut December 6 vs. Kansas City at home.

1972 NFL season
The September 25 game marked the New Orleans Saints' debut on Monday Night Football. The Saints' opponents, the Kansas City Chiefs, returned to Tulane Stadium for the first time since their Super Bowl IV victory over the Minnesota Vikings. Chiefs coach Hank Stram later coached the Saints in 1976 and 1977, although the team moved to the Louisiana Superdome in 1975. Saints quarterback Archie Manning made his Monday Night debut as well; 23 years later, his son, Eli Manning, made his Monday Night debut for the New York Giants against the Saints in a game relocated from New Orleans to Giants Stadium after the devastation of Hurricane Katrina three weeks prior.

The Patriots were the other team to make its MNF debut in 1972, hosting the Colts November 6.

The October 9 game between the Oakland Raiders and Houston Oilers at the Astrodome is infamous for an awkward off-field incident. During the game, which the Raiders won in a 34–0 shutout, ABC cameras had panned out and showed several fans leaving. A cameraman caught one of the few to stay in the game, who showed his disgust with the Oilers' performance by raising his middle finger, prompting Don Meredith to quip, "We're number 1 in the nation." The game was the first in the series' three-year history to pit two former AFL clubs against each other.

The November 27 game saw the Miami Dolphins make their lone primetime appearance during their 17–0 season. The Dolphins had little trouble in dispatching the outclassed St. Louis Cardinals, one of nine games the Dolphins won that season against teams which won five or fewer games (the Cardinals finished 4-9-1 for the third time in four seasons, and did so again in 1973).

The December 11 game saw the New York Jets wide receiver Don Maynard set a new NFL record for pass receptions when he caught his 632nd reception, a record that stood until 1975 when Charley Taylor became the NFL all-time pass receptions record holder.

1973 NFL season
The Broncos and Bills were the last of the 26 teams of the merged NFL to make their first appearances on the program, but not against each other, rather, alone in consecutive weeks.

During what would be Don Meredith's final season of his first Monday Night stint, he was the center of three incidents in a three-week stand. In the Oakland-Denver game on October 22, Meredith famously quipped, "We're in the Mile High City, and so am I" (referring to his marijuana use at the time), followed by his drinking through the Buffalo–Kansas City game the following week. Finally, on November 5 during the Steelers-Redskins matchup, he referred to President Richard Nixon by the nickname of "Tricky Dick".

The October 8 game ended in dramatic fashion as Redskins safety Ken Houston stopped Cowboy running back Walt Garrison at the Washington one-yard-line as time expired to preserve a 14–7 Redskins victory.

The Minnesota Vikings entered the November 19 game in Atlanta with a spotless 9–0 record, but left with their first loss. The Falcons jumped out to a 17–7 halftime lead, then held on as the Vikings came up one yard short on fourth down at the Atlanta 39 with 55 seconds to play. The victory was the Falcons sixth in a row. The victory was sweet revenge for Falcons head coach Norm Van Brocklin, who was the Vikings' first head coach from 1961 to 1966, and quarterback Bob Lee, a Vikings backup from 1969 to 1972 (as well as punter from 1969 to 1971), and again in 1976 and '77.

Only one home team lost out of the 13 games: Cleveland to Miami 17–9 on October 15 (the Raiders and Broncos played to a 23–23 tie in Denver a week later).

1974 NFL season
The season-opening contest in Buffalo on September 16 marked the start of a three-year stint for Alex Karras as a color commentator for the show. Karras had replaced Fred Williamson, who had originally replaced Don Meredith, but was dismissed after a poorly received effort during a few preseason contests. The Raiders' loss was their first on Monday Night, and would be their last until 1986.

The October 14 game between the Lions and 49ers marked the final Monday Night Football game ever at Tiger Stadium.

Facing huge competition from the October 28 CBS broadcast of the wedding of Rhoda Morgenstern on Rhoda and NBC's November 18 broadcast of The Godfather, ratings for Monday Night Football took a hit for those two contests. On that October 28, Pittsburgh defeated Atlanta for the 14th consecutive home team victory on Monday Night and the 15th consecutive without a loss. The streak was snapped the following week when Los Angeles won at San Francisco, the fourth of 10 consecutive Rams victories at Candlestick Park.

The November 25 game at Tulane Stadium marked the first time ABC broadcast a Monday Night game in the same facility which would host the Super Bowl at the end of the season. Ironically, the Pittsburgh Steelers defeated the New Orleans Saints in the MNF game, then came back January 12, 1975 and ousted the Minnesota Vikings on the same field to win their first championship in franchise history. In between, ABC telecast the final Sugar Bowl played at Tulane Stadium, with Nebraska edging Florida 13–10 on New Year's Eve.

After losing to the Steelers, the Saints did not return to MNF for five years.

From 1974 to 1977, the Monday night game aired on Saturday during the final week of the regular season. Previously, there had been no prime-time game in the season's final week.

1975 NFL season
The Oakland Raiders' defeat of the Miami Dolphins on September 22 ended the Dolphins 31-game home winning streak. During this game, ABC switched at halftime to ABC News anchor Harry Reasoner for an update on the assassination attempt on President Ford by Sara Jane Moore earlier that day.

The October 6 game marked the first regular season game ever played in the Pontiac Silverdome, the then-new home of the Detroit Lions.  The Dallas Cowboys, who had missed the playoffs in 1974 for the first time in nine years, beat the Lions on their way to a 4–0 start to the season. The Cowboys would return to the playoffs in 1975, starting a new nine-year streak of playoff berths, and became the first NFL wild card team ever to play in the Super Bowl.

Following their surprising 34–31 victory at Dallas Nov. 10, Kansas City did not win another MNF game until 1991. The Chiefs-Cowboys game is best remembered for a diving one-handed touchdown reception by the Cowboys' Golden Richards at the back of the end zone.

The final Monday Night Football game of the season offered one of the least attractive contests in the six-year history of the program: The 1–11 San Diego Chargers hosted the 3–9 New York Jets, with the Chargers pulling an upset 24–16 victory.

This was the first season that the Rams did not appear in one of the final two games of the season. The Rams played at home in the final Monday night game four of the first five seasons of Monday Night Football.  Nevertheless, the Rams did play in the final game covered by the MNF team on Saturday, December 20, where they defeated the eventual Super Bowl champion Steelers.

1976 NFL season
This season saw the first Monday night overtime game since overtime was instituted for the regular season in 1974, as the Redskins kicked a field goal in the extra period to beat the Eagles 20–17.

The October 11 game marked the first time the Rams had ever been shut out at Los Angeles Memorial Coliseum in their team history. The 49ers sacked Rams quarterback James Harris 10 times, six alone by defensive end Tommy Hart.

The October 18 game featured Alex Karras singing a fight song written for the New York Jets by then-head coach Lou Holtz before the kickoff (which was repeated for the NFL Top 10 series in the episode on "Coaches Who Belonged in College").

1976 also marked the program using a new theme song for the introduction.

1977 NFL season
The September 26 game was decided in overtime on Don Cockroft's 35-yard field goal with 10:15 left in the extra session.

This was Don Meredith's first season back in the booth, after three seasons at NBC. He would remain through the 1984 season.

The October 10 game was Joe Namath's last NFL start and last NFL game.

1978 NFL season
The September 4 game, the 1978 MNF season opener, was when Howard Cosell and the announcing crew was given a plate of nachos and Cosell began using the term 'nacho' for the duration of the game; this moment is notable for helping spread the popularity of the dish outside of its native Texas where it was invented.

The September 18 game between the Colts and the Patriots featured a Monday Night Football-record 41 points scored between the two teams in the fourth quarter, 27 by the Colts. Colts running back Joe Washington had a memorable performance, scoring or helping score his teams' final three touchdowns. His catch of a touchdown pass tied the game at 20–20, and then he threw an option pass to Roger Carr to put the Colts ahead 27–20.  After the Patriots tied it late, Washington returned the ensuing kickoff 96 yards for the winning touchdown.

The November 20 game between the Dolphins and the Oilers featured a memorable performance by Oilers' rookie running back Earl Campbell. Campbell rushed for 199 yards and four touchdowns in a nip-and-tuck game that was capped off by his 81-yard scoring run in the fourth quarter. It was the first MNF telecast from the Astrodome since the infamous 1972 game versus the Oakland Raiders where a fan gave the middle finger to a camera.

The November 27 game between the Pittsburgh Steelers and San Francisco 49ers kicked off at 6 pm. Pacific time, just hours after San Francisco mayor George Moscone and city supervisor Harvey Milk were murdered at City Hall by former supervisor Dan White. NFL commissioner Pete Rozelle, a former publicity director at the University of San Francisco, did not consider postponing the game. During the game, a large protest march to the steps of City Hall took place. A rarely discussed moment happened before the game just prior the national anthem. The stadium observed a moment of silence to honor the fallen mayor. Between that and the national anthem a truck backed into the stadium flag pole sending it crashing to the ground. It was a large wooden pole near the southern end zone. It shocked the crowd who were already uneasy from a very tragic day in San Francisco.

In the regular season finale December 18, New England Patriots coach Chuck Fairbanks was not present, suspended by owner Billy Sullivan after he accepted the same position at the University of Colorado. Coordinators Ron Erhardt and Hank Bullough served as co-coaches for the game, which the Miami Dolphins won 23–3. Fairbanks was allowed to coach the Patriots in the AFC divisional playoff vs. Houston, which New England lost 31–14.

From 1978 to 1986, ABC would televise some Thursday and Sunday night games.

1979 NFL season
The September 4 opening game between the Pittsburgh Steelers and New England Patriots was stopped for more than five minutes in the second quarter to acknowledge former Patriots wide receiver Darryl Stingley, who was seated in a luxury box at Schaefer Stadium. Stingley had suffered a career-ending injury 13 months earlier that had left him a quadriplegic.

The October 1 game at Lambeau Field marked the first time ever that a Monday Night Football game had taken place in Green Bay. The three previous Packers home games in the series had taken place in Milwaukee (1970, 1971, and 1973). Two weeks later, the Jets hosted the first ever MNF game in New York City, and defeated the Vikings.

The Seattle Seahawks made their MNF debut October 29 versus the Atlanta Falcons. Four weeks later, they played their first MNF home game versus the New York Jets.

In the November 12 game between the Eagles and the Cowboys, barefoot Eagles kicker Tony Franklin booted a 59-yard field goal. It was the longest MNF field goal until Oakland's Sebastian Janikowski hit an altitude-assisted 63-yarder at Denver in 2011, tying the league record as it then stood, and is still the Monday night non-altitude assisted record.

In the December 3 Raiders/Saints game, Ken Stabler rallied the Raiders from a 35–14 deficit. He threw an 8-yard touchdown pass to Cliff Branch for the winning score. Stabler later played for the Saints from 1982 through the first half of 1984. The loss ended up costing the Saints their first winning season, as they finished 8-8; New Orleans would not finish above .500 until 1987.

1980s

1980 NFL season
Dallas defeated Washington marking the first time that those teams opened up the Monday Night Football season.

The Tampa Bay Buccaneers played their first game on ABC Thursday, September 11 at home versus the Los Angeles Rams, then played their first Monday night game at Chicago October 6.

The November 24 game was the one where New Orleans Saints fans, watching what would become a dreadful 1–15 campaign that season, began wearing paper bags over their heads and referring to the team as the "Aints". One night later, Sugar Ray Leonard defeated Roberto Duran in the famous 'No Mas' bout for the welterweight world boxing championship.

The December 8 game was forever remembered for Howard Cosell's announcement of the murder of John Lennon with three seconds left in the fourth quarter. ABC News' Nightline provided live coverage of Lennon's death shortly after the conclusion of the game.

1981 NFL season
The December 7 game between the Oakland Raiders and Pittsburgh Steelers would mark the final Monday night game played in Oakland prior to the Raiders' move to Los Angeles. The next Monday night game played in Oakland would be held in 1996; one year after the Raiders' return to Oakland in 1995.

The 2 teams that didn't participate this season were the eventual NFC champion San Francisco 49ers and the eventual AFC champion Cincinnati Bengals. Both teams later participated in the Super Bowl, where the 49ers won the game & the title 26-21. This was also the 1st time that the 2 eventual Super Bowl contenders didn't play in a Monday Night Football game.

Home teams won every game ABC aired after the month of September, a total of 14 contests.

1982 NFL season
This was the season in which a nine-week players’ strike forced the NFL to postpone seven regular season games. The September 20 game between the Packers and the Giants would be the last game played until November 21. The Packers-Giants game was the first Monday night game hosted by the Giants.

The Tampa Bay Buccaneers hosted their first Monday night game November 29 versus the in-state rival Miami Dolphins, the first regular season meeting between the teams since the Buccaneers' inaugural year of 1976. In 1980, the Buccaneers hosted the Los Angeles Rams in a Thursday night game on ABC.

In the January 3 game between the Cowboys and the Vikings, Cowboys running back Tony Dorsett ran for 99 yards and a touchdown – still the longest running play from scrimmage in the NFL. Worth noting is that the Cowboys had only ten players on offense when the ball was snapped on that play, as fullback Ron Springs did not get onto the playing field in time after Minnesota kicked off to Dallas in the third quarter.

The Cowboys-Vikings game originally was scheduled to be played on Sunday, September 26 (Week 3), but was canceled due to the players’ strike, and then was among 14 canceled games rescheduled to a newly added Week 17 when the strike was settled. This resulted in the Cowboys playing three of their nine regular season games on MNF; the only other teams with two MNF games in the shortened season were the San Diego Chargers and Miami Dolphins (incidentally, the November 8 game pitting the Chargers against the Dolphins in a rematch of "The Epic in Miami" was one of the games canceled as a result of the strike).

The San Francisco 49ers became the first reigning Super Bowl champion not to play a Monday night game, although they were featured in ABC games on other nights (one Thursday, one Sunday). Their scheduled Monday game (week 4 at Tampa Bay) fell victim to the strike.

1983 NFL season
The September 5 game between the Cowboys and the Redskins was when Howard Cosell referred to Redskins wide receiver Alvin Garrett as a "little monkey." Cosell would also call his final MNF game on December 12 between the Packers and the Buccaneers, and his final NFL game on ABC on Friday night, December 16, between the Jets and Dolphins at Miami. Cosell did not make the trip to the west coast for the last game of the season between the Cowboys and the San Francisco 49ers.

Future Hall of Fame quarterback Dan Marino made his NFL debut in the September 19 game between the Raiders and the Dolphins.

The October 10 game between the Pittsburgh Steelers and the Cincinnati Bengals is remembered for the Steelers' Keith Gary grabbing the facemask of Bengals quarterback Ken Anderson on a first-quarter sack and twisting his head 180 degrees. Anderson was knocked out of the game and backup Turk Schonert threw three interceptions, two of which the Steelers returned for touchdowns in a 24–14 Steelers win.

The October 24 game between the Cardinals and the Giants is the only overtime tie in MNF history, as the Cardinals' Neil O'Donoghue blew three field goal attempts in the extra period, one of them from extra-point distance. It was also the first overtime game on a Monday night since Howard Cosell announced the death of John Lennon in 1980.

Both of the Redskins' regular season losses during the 1983 season came on Monday night (Week 1 at home to Dallas; Week 7 to the Packers in Green Bay) by a margin of 1 point in each game.

Following their December 12 overtime loss to the Green Bay Packers, the Tampa Bay Buccaneers did not play another game on ABC until 1998.

From 1983 to 1986 in addition to some Thursday and Sunday night games, ABC would also televise a Friday night game in week 16.

1984 NFL season
The September 6 Thursday special game between the Pittsburgh Steelers and the New York Jets was the first primetime game hosted by the Jets in New Jersey, after relocating from Shea Stadium to Giants Stadium. The Jets previously played a September 1977 game in New Jersey after a scheduling conflict with the New York Mets at Shea.

An early season snowstorm in the October 15 game at Denver caused the Packers to fumble on their first two plays. Both fumbles were returned for Broncos touchdowns.  However, the 5-1 Broncos' offense could only muster an additional field goal as the 1-5 Packers scored two touchdowns in the second half and very nearly pulled an upset.

The October 21 Sunday special game between the New Orleans Saints and Dallas Cowboys started at 9:45 EDT (8:45 CDT) due to ABC covering the second 1984 Ronald Reagan–Walter Mondale debate. This was the latest time a regular season NFL game started until 2006 – beginning that year, MNF on ESPN would air two games in week 1, the second kicking off after 10:00 pm EDT. The 1984 Saints-Cowboys game remains the latest NFL kickoff on a broadcast network.

1984 marked the third straight year in which the Cowboys played in both the MNF season opener and season finale. The Cowboys would open the MNF season again in 1985 and 1986 to complete a run of seven Monday night openers in nine seasons. However, they would not close the season on MNF again until 1995, a Christmas night game at Arizona.

1985 NFL season
The September 19 Thursday night game is memorable for Bears quarterback Jim McMahon's third quarter performance. Bears coach Mike Ditka elected not to start McMahon because of various ailments keeping him out of practice all week. ABC cameras kept showing McMahon begging Ditka to put him in the game. Finally, with the Vikings leading 17–9, McMahon entered the game and threw a 70-yard touchdown pass to Willie Gault on his first snap.  The Bears immediately got the ball back at the Vikings' 25-yard line on the next series on a Wilber Marshall fumble recovery, and McMahon hit Dennis McKinnon on the very first play for a touchdown. Then, on the very next series, McMahon completed 3 of 5 passes and another touchdown to McKinnon. For the third quarter, McMahon had taken seven snaps and completed five passes for three touchdowns.

The October 21 game is memorable for rookie Bears defensive lineman William Perry scoring a rushing touchdown after entering the game as an extra backfield blocker.

The October 28 game marked the final Monday night appearance at home for the Los Angeles Raiders until their return to Oakland in 1995, as well as the final Monday night game at the Los Angeles Memorial Coliseum until 2018.

In the November 11 game, a thrown snowball caused the 49ers to miss an extra point, a determining factor in the team's one-point loss.

The November 18 game between the Giants and the Redskins is infamous for Lawrence Taylor's sack that left Joe Theismann with a broken leg, ending Theismann's career.

The December 2 game between the Bears and the Dolphins, when the Dolphins put an end to the Bears' bid to match their undefeated season in 1972, was and still is the highest rated game in Monday Night Football history.

1986 NFL season
During this season, MacGyver began a six-year run as the program's lead-in – the longest lasting such program in history.

The September 8 game between the New York Giants and the Dallas Cowboys marked the NFL debut of Herschel Walker.

The September 29 game was the last MNF game in St. Louis until 2000, when the Rams played their season opener at the Trans World Dome.

The October 27 game took place at the same time as Game 7 of the 1986 World Series at Shea Stadium in nearby Flushing, New York (the World Series finale was scheduled for the previous night, but was rained out).

The Sunday, December 7 game between the Los Angeles Rams and Dallas Cowboys is remembered for Cowboys head coach Tom Landry being escorted off the field before the start of the 4th quarter due to Anaheim police learning of a threat on Landry's life. Landry would return after being fitted with a bulletproof vest.

1987 NFL season
There was a player strike called after the completion of Week 2's games. As a result, all games for Week 3 were canceled but unlike the 1982 players' strike, owners decided to resume play with replacement players. Replacement players were used in games played from Week 4 until Week 6 (including the 49ers–Giants, Raiders–Broncos, and Redskins–Cowboys MNF games). Once a new collective bargaining agreement ended the strike, regular players came back and played starting with Week 7.

The October 26 game between the Broncos and the Vikings was rescheduled because Game 7 of the 1987 World Series (which was also broadcast by ABC), which featured the Minnesota Twins, had to play at the Hubert H. Humphrey Metrodome on Sunday night, when the Vikings were originally slated to host the Broncos. Therefore, the game was moved to Monday night, and was played simultaneously with the Browns–Rams game. Coincidentally, the Browns had been slated to host the Broncos in the canceled Monday night game (in a rematch of The Drive). The Broncos-Vikings game, originally to be shown on NBC, was broadcast only in Colorado and Minnesota as part of ABC's ''Monday Night Football.'' The rest of the country saw the previously scheduled game: Los Angeles Rams at Cleveland, which turned out to be Eric Dickerson's last with the Rams.

The November 30 Raiders/Seahawks game marked the memorable Monday Night Football debut of Bo Jackson, with his 91-yard touchdown run. Prior to that, he ran over Seahawks linebacker Brian Bosworth for another score.

* Did not play due to 1987 NFL strike.

1988 NFL season
The September 12 game between the Cowboys and the Cardinals was the first game the Cardinals played in Arizona after relocating from St. Louis. The Cardinals did not return to MNF until the 1995 finale on Christmas Day, also against the Cowboys.

The October 3 game between the Cowboys and the Saints would be the final MNF game coached by Tom Landry, as well as for the Cowboys team as a whole until 1991.

The October 17 game between the Bills and the Jets would be the last game for Jets defensive end Mark Gastineau prior to Gastineau's sudden retirement; stated as being due to wanting to care for his mistress, actress Brigette Nielsen, following a uterine cancer diagnosis.

1989 NFL season
The October 9 game between the Raiders and the Jets was the first game for Art Shell as the Raiders head coach, becoming the first African-American NFL head coach in the modern era (Shell had been named interim head coach following the firing of Mike Shanahan).

The November 6 game between the Saints and the 49ers was originally scheduled for New Orleans but was switched with their October 8 game when the San Francisco Giants played in the NLCS.

The December 11 game between the 49ers and the Rams had John Taylor become the first player in NFL history to score two touchdowns of over 90 yards in a single game.

The December 25 game between the Bengals and the Vikings was the first NFL game played on Christmas Day since the 1971 divisional playoffs. (The Vikings also hosted one of the two Christmas Day 1971 playoff games, losing to the eventual Super Bowl VI champion Cowboys.)

1989 marked the first year in which the Miami Dolphins did not appear on Monday Night Football. The Miami Dolphins appeared on ABC's Monday Night Football every year except for this year and the 2005 season.

1989 also marked Monday Night Football'''s 20th season, and Hank Williams, Jr. made his debut to the program with his hit "All My Rowdy Friends".

See alsoMonday Night FootballMonday Night Football results (1990–2009)
Monday Night Football results (2010–present)
ESPN Sunday Night Football results (1987–2005)
NBC Sunday Night Football results (2006–present)
Thursday Night Football results (2006–present)

References

 Total Football II,'', Edited by Bob Carroll, Michael Gershman, David Neft and John Thorn, HarperCollins Publishing, 1999. .

National Football League lists
Monday Night Football
National Football League on television results
ABC Sports